Mount Betarim (Har haBetarim) is one of the peaks of Mount Dov (known also as "Jabal Ross"). According to one Jewish tradition this is the site of the covenant of the pieces between Abraham and God. According to Muslim tradition, this is the site in which an event occurred, which is described in the Quran, where God commanded Abraham to sacrifice four species of birds, and afterwards resurrected them. Therefore, it was called in Arabic "Mashhad A-Tir al-Ibrahim" (مشهد الطير الإبراهيمي) meaning "The sacred site of Abraham's birds" or "Makam Ibrahim Al-Khalil" 
(مقام إبراهيم الخليل) meaning "The sacred site of Abraham, God's friend".

Archaeology 
The site contains remains of an ancient settlement, which includes the agricultural steps and pottery from the Hellenistic period and from the Byzantine period. The site also includes two water reservoirs and five grave structures.

See also 
 The covenant of the pieces

Hebrew Bible mountains
Jewish holy places
Islamic holy places
Jewish pilgrimage sites